Knightsbridge is a London Underground station in Knightsbridge, London.  It is on the Piccadilly line between South Kensington and Hyde Park Corner, and is in Travelcard Zone 1.

History

The station was opened on 15 December 1906 by the Great Northern, Piccadilly and Brompton Railway (GNP&BR, now the Piccadilly line). When opened, the platforms were accessed in the standard manner by four lifts and an emergency staircase connecting to parallel passageways and bridges to midway along the platforms. The original station building designed by Leslie Green was located on Brompton Road a short distance west of its junction with Knightsbridge and Sloane Street. A rear entrance was located on Basil Street.

The location of the station in a busy and fashionable shopping district meant that patronage at the station was high from the beginning, particularly due to the presence locally of the Harrods and Harvey Nichols emporiums. This contrasted with the next station on the line westward — Brompton Road — where passenger numbers were so low that from soon after its opening many trains were timetabled not to stop there.

1930s reconstruction

In the early 1930s, the availability of government grants to stimulate the depressed economy enabled the Underground Group to carry out a major modernisation programme, during which many central London stations were brought up to date with escalators to replace the original lifts. Knightsbridge was one of the Piccadilly line stations to benefit from the installation of escalators.

To enable the escalators to reach the existing platforms without excessive below ground reconstruction or interference with station operations a new ticket hall was constructed under the Brompton Road/Knightsbridge/Sloane Street junction and new circulation passages were constructed at the lower level. A new station entrance was inserted into the existing building on the corner of Brompton Road and Sloane Street. Subway entrances on the other corners of the junction enabled pedestrians to avoid the traffic on the busy junction. The original entrances in Brompton Road and Basil Street were closed. The Brompton Road building was subsequently demolished, but the rear entrance at the corner of Basil Street and Hoopers Court remains, although converted for use as offices.

To ease congestion, it was also decided to provide an additional entrance to the western end of the platforms closer to Harrods. The additional exit would further diminish the passenger numbers at Brompton Road so this station was scheduled to close. A separate ticket hall was provided for the western escalators which is accessed by a long subway from the surface entrance at the corner of Hans Crescent. This narrow subway was to be a regular problem, often becoming congested with groups of passengers trying to pass each other in the confined space.

Eventually in 2004, this congestion was solved by the expansion of this exit into a large circular area, under the road towards Harrods, with the way out of the station being by a stairway in the midst of the road.

Station upgrade in the 2010s 
In recent years, several piecemeal improvements to the station have occurred. The platforms were refurbished in 2005, with the 1930s cream-coloured tiles being concealed behind a modern metal cladding system. In December 2010, a new entrance was opened across the road from the station, as part of the One Hyde Park residential development.

In 2017, a major upgrade to the station was announced, with two new entrances constructed on Brompton Road and Hooper's Court. The new Hooper's Court entrance will have two large lifts, which will allow for step-free access throughout the station. This entrance will also re-open some areas of the station that were closed in the early 1930s when escalators were installed.

, the new entrances are estimated to open in 2021 - with the station becoming step free at that time. Most of the upgrade costs will be paid for by Knightsbridge Estate and developers Chelsfield, who own (and plan to redevelop) the property above the station. TfL are contributing £12m, enabling step-free access to be extended to platform level.

In popular culture

The station appeared in a 1992 episode of Rumpole of the Bailey (Rumpole and the Children of the Devil), as Horace Rumpole and his wife Hilda travel there separately from Temple and Gloucester Road stations respectively. They exit Knightsbridge station from the stairs at the former street level portico on the corner of Hans Crescent and Brompton Road, which has since been redeveloped as the main entrance to a Zara fashion shop at 79 Brompton Road.

The opening scene of the 1997 film version of Henry James's The Wings of the Dove was set on the east-bound platforms at both Dover Street and Knightsbridge stations, both represented by the same studio mock-up, complete with a working recreation of a 1906 Stock train.

Gallery

Connections
London Buses routes 9, 14, 19, 22, 23, 52, 74, 137, 414, 452, C1 and night routes N9, N19, N22, N74 and N137 serve the station.

Notes

External links
 
 
 
 
  Compare elevation with current image which shows changes have been made to increase the width of the façade and to the first floor windows
 
 
 
 

Piccadilly line stations
London Underground Night Tube stations
Tube stations in the Royal Borough of Kensington and Chelsea
Former Great Northern, Piccadilly and Brompton Railway stations
Railway stations in Great Britain opened in 1906
Knightsbridge
Leslie Green railway stations